John Sparks (1778 – 5 March 1854) was an English professional cricketer. He bowled slow underarm.

Sparks was mainly associated with Surrey and he made 50 known appearances in first-class matches from 1803 to 1829.

Sparks played for the Players in the second Gentlemen v Players match in 1806.

References

1778 births
1854 deaths
English cricketers
English cricketers of 1787 to 1825
English cricketers of 1826 to 1863
Kent cricketers
Surrey cricketers
Players cricketers
Marylebone Cricket Club cricketers
William Ward's XI cricketers
George Osbaldeston's XI cricketers
Non-international England cricketers
Marylebone Cricket Club Second 10 with 1 Other cricketers
Marylebone Cricket Club First 9 with 3 Others cricketers